Börde – Jerichower Land is an electoral constituency (German: Wahlkreis) represented in the Bundestag. It elects one member via first-past-the-post voting. Under the current constituency numbering system, it is designated as constituency 67. It is located in northern Saxony-Anhalt, comprising the districts of Börde and Jerichower Land.

Börde – Jerichower Land was created for the 2009 federal election. Since 2021, it has been represented by Franziska Kersten of the Social Democratic Party (SPD).

Geography
Börde – Jerichower Land is located in northern Saxony-Anhalt. As of the 2021 federal election, it comprises the districts of Börde and Jerichower Land.

History
Börde – Jerichower Land was created in 2009 and contained parts of the abolished constituencies of Elbe-Havel-Gebiet and Börde. In the 2009 election, it was constituency 68 in the numbering system. Since the 2013 election, it has been number 67. Its borders have not changed since its creation.

Members
The constituency was represented by Manfred Behrens of the Christian Democratic Union (CDU) from its formation until 2021. Franziska Kersten won it for the Social Democratic Party (SPD) in 2021.

Election results

2021 election

2017 election

2013 election

2009 election

References

Federal electoral districts in Saxony-Anhalt
2009 establishments in Germany
Constituencies established in 2009